The 4th (Westphalian) Cuirassiers “von Driesen” was a heavy cavalry regiment of the Royal Prussian Army. The regiment was formed in 1717. The regiment fought in the Silesian Wars, the War of the Sixth Coalition, the Austro-Prussian War, the Franco-Prussian War and World War I. The regiment was disbanded in 1919.

See also
List of Imperial German cavalry regiments

References

Cuirassiers of the Prussian Army
Military units and formations established in 1717
Military units and formations disestablished in 1919
1717 establishments in Prussia